Xylokastro is a seaside town or village and a former municipality in Corinthia in the Peloponnese, Greece. Since the 2011 local government reform it is part of the municipality Xylokastro-Evrostina, of which it is a unit or component. The municipal unit has an area of 310.252 km2. In 2011 its population was 5,715 for the town and 13,277 for the municipal unit.

Geographic features include a long 2 km beach and semi-arid forest on varied terrain, scattered with early churches and evidence of early settlements and religious sites.  It has narrowly separated upper and lower coastal roads and forms a medium-sized touristic village on the Gulf of Corinth.

Subdivisions
The municipal unit Xylokastro is subdivided into the following communities (2011 population and constituent villages in brackets):

 Ano Trikala (104, Ano Trikala, Zireia)
 Dendro (144)
 Geliniatika (431, Geliniatika, Spartinaaika)
 Kamari (903, Kamari, Kariotika)
 Karya (597, Karya, Kariotika)
 Kato Loutro (442, Kato Loutro, Ano Loutro)
 Kato Synoikia Trikalon (254)
 Korfiotissa (75)
 Lagkadaiika (74, Lagkadaiika, Amfithea)
 Manna (476)
 Melissi (913)
 Mesi Synoikia Trikalon (73)
 Nees Vrysoules (76)
 Panariti (349)
 Pellini (82)
 Pitsa (669, Ano Pitsa, Kato Pitsa)
 Rethi (194)
 Riza (429, Riza, Valtos, Georgantaiika, Sigeritsa, Chartsianika)
 Sofiana (80)
 Stylia (147)
 Sykia (492)
 Thalero (162)
 Throfari  (73)
 Xanthochori (83)
 Xylokastro (5,715, Xylokastro, Mertikaiika)
 Zemeno (240)

Population

Geography

Xylokastro is situated on the coast of the Gulf of Corinth, 30 km northwest of Corinth, near the mouth of the river Trikalitikos. Apart from the narrow strip of land along the coast, where the town Xylokastro lies, the municipal unit is mountainous. The Greek National Road 8a (Corinth - Patras) passes through the town.

History

The town took its name from a wooden castle, probably built in the 13th century. It was also known as Solo Castro. The village Stylia was known as Viladusa by the Venetians in the 18th century.

People
 Vlassis Bonatsos (1949 - October 14, 2004 in Athens, Greece), a Greek actor
 Panagis Tsaldaris (1932 - November 3, 1933 in Athens, Greece, former prime minister
 Sotiris Krokidas (1922 - September 17, 1922 14 November in Athens. Greece former prime minister

References

External links 
 Official website - Municipality of Xylokastro-Evrostina (in Greek)
 GTP - Xylokastro
 GTP - Municipality of Xylokastro

See also
 List of settlements in Corinthia

Dissolved municipalities and communes in Greece
Populated places in Corinthia